is a Japanese rugby union player who plays as a prop. He was signed by the Sunwolves for the 2016 season of the international Super Rugby competition. He has also played for Australian team Melbourne Rebels and Top League side the Panasonic Wild Knights in his home country.

Career

Inagaki started his professional career with the Panasonic Wild Knights where he lifted the Top League title in each of his first two seasons and was named in the Top League team of the year for 2014–15.   Such was his impact in his first two seasons as a professional that when injuries struck the Melbourne Rebels two Japanese players Shota Horie and Male Sa'u, Inagaki was signed up as a concessional signing on a one-year deal ahead of the 2015 Super Rugby season.

International career

Inagaki featured in all four of Japan's games during the 2014 end-of-year rugby union internationals with the first two matches being non-cap internationals against the Māori All Blacks.   His official test debut came against  in Bucharest on 15 November 2014 and he won his second cap a week later against  in Tbilisi. Inagaki was selected in the Japanese squad for the 2015 Rugby World Cup in England. He played in all five games for Japan which included their big upset over South Africa 34-32 in Brighton. Japan finished the 2015 World Cup with 3 wins out of 5 games but failed to reach the quarterfinals. Inagaki was also selected in Japan's squad for the 2019 Rugby World Cup which was to be held in Japan. Inagaki helped Japan reach their first ever quarterfinals where they went on to lose to eventual winners South Africa 26-3. Inagaki scored a try in Japan's pool match against Scotland which was his first ever test try and also helped push Japan to a 28-21 win.

References

External links

1990 births
Living people
Japanese rugby union players
Japan international rugby union players
Japanese expatriate rugby union players
Japanese expatriate sportspeople in Australia
Expatriate rugby union players in Australia
Rugby union props
Saitama Wild Knights players
Melbourne Rebels players
Sunwolves players
People from Niigata (city)
Sportspeople from Niigata Prefecture